Delmar Banner (28 January 1896 – 8 November 1983) was a British painter. His work was part of the painting event in the art competition at the 1948 Summer Olympics.

References

1896 births
1983 deaths
20th-century British painters
British male painters
Olympic competitors in art competitions
Artists from Freiburg im Breisgau
German emigrants to the United Kingdom
19th-century British male artists
20th-century British male artists